Nighthawks is the only studio album by American hip hop duo Nighthawks, which consisted of rappers Cage and Camu Tao. It was released on November 26, 2002 under Eastern Conference Records. The album is a rap opera concept album.

Background 
Nighthawks came to be through Cage's love for police movies. It puts Cage and Camu Tao in the personas of fictional police detectives "Deke DaSilva" and "Matthew Fox". The album was created in a one-week creative binge.

Music 
The album is mostly produced by Camu Tao and DJ Mighty Mi, with one song's production by DJ Trueskillz. Guest appearances include Tame One, Metro of S.A. Smash, Space and The High & Mighty.

Track listing

References

External links
 Nighthawks at Bandcamp
 Nighthawks at Discogs

2002 debut albums
Cage (rapper) albums
Eastern Conference Records albums